Palm Beach Airport may refer to:

 North Palm Beach County General Aviation Airport in Palm Beach Gardens, Florida, United States
 Palm Beach County Glades Airport in Palm Beach, Florida, United States
 Palm Beach County Park Airport in Palm Beach, Florida, United States
 Palm Beach International Airport in Palm Beach, Florida, United States
 Palm Beach Water Airport in Sydney, New South Wales, Australia